The Acme siren is a musical instrument used in concert bands for comic effect.  Often used in cartoons, it produces the stylized sound of a police siren. It is one of the few aerophones in the percussion section of an orchestra.

The instrument is typically made of metal and is cylindrical.  Inside the cylinder is a type of fan-blade which, when the performer blows through one end, spins and creates the sound. The faster the performer blows, the faster the fan-blade moves and the higher the pitch the instrument creates.  Conversely, the slower the performer blows, the lower the pitch.

Iannis Xenakis used it in the 1960s in his works Oresteia, Terretektorh, and Persephassa.

A siren was used in Bob Dylan's classic album, Highway 61 Revisited.

Acme is the trade name of J Hudson & Co of Birmingham, England, who developed and patented the Acme siren in 1895. It was sometimes known as "the cyclist's road clearer".

See also 
 Acme Corporation

References

External links 
 Archive.org: MP3 audio of an Acme Siren, on Hudson's website

Blown percussion instruments
Orchestral percussion instruments
Unpitched percussion instruments
19th-century percussion instruments